Kentucky Route 676 (KY 676) is a Kentucky State Highway located almost entirely within the city limits of Frankfort. The four-lane divided highway is locally known as the East–West Connector.

Because Frankfort is bisected by the steep gorge of the Kentucky River, east–west transportation through the city was historically a challenge. The road was built mainly to divert local traffic between the two sides of Frankfort from congested and sometimes hazardous local streets. Its western terminus is at US 127 on the west side of Frankfort, just north of that road's interchange with Interstate 64. The road steeply descends to the river, briefly exiting the city limits just before it crosses the river in unincorporated Franklin County. Immediately after crossing the river, the road reenters Frankfort and ascends toward Its eastern terminus at a single-point urban interchange with US 60 and US 421.

Route description

KY 676 begins at an intersection with US 127 in Frankfort, heading northeast on East–West Connector, a four-lane divided highway. The road passes businesses before curving east into wooded areas. The route intersects KY 420, at which point that route turns east to form a concurrency with KY 676. The road curves northeast, with KY 420 splitting to the northwest. KY 676 crosses the Kentucky River and passes more woods, intersecting KY 1784. The route crosses KY 1659 and heads east, passing near a few commercial establishments. The road winds southeast before heading east again as it passes through more woodland with some residential neighborhoods, coming to a bridge over a R.J. Corman Railroad line. KY 676 reaches its eastern terminus at a single-point urban interchange with US 60 and US 421, where the road continues east as part of US 421.

Major intersections

References

External links
  

Frankfort, Kentucky
0676